Viktar Staselovich (born 28 May 1994) is a Belarusian swimmer. He competed in the men's 100 metre backstroke event at the 2016 Summer Olympics.

References

External links
 

1994 births
Living people
Belarusian male swimmers
Olympic swimmers of Belarus
Swimmers at the 2016 Summer Olympics
Place of birth missing (living people)
Male backstroke swimmers
20th-century Belarusian people
21st-century Belarusian people